Arcola Airport  is located adjacent to Arcola, Saskatchewan, Canada. Burton Ag Air Ltd. operates a fixed base at the airport.

See also
List of airports in Saskatchewan

References

External links
 Page about this airport on COPA's Places to Fly airport directory

Registered aerodromes in Saskatchewan